Judge Mkandawire (born 25 November 1986) is a retired Zambian football striker.

References

1986 births
Living people
Zambian footballers
Zambia international footballers
Young Arrows F.C. players
Red Arrows F.C. players
Zanaco F.C. players
NAPSA Stars F.C. players
Nakambala Leopards F.C. players
Association football forwards